The Vietnamese people in Cyprus number more than 12,000 individuals.

Community organizations
Vietnamese-speaking people celebrate Tết, the traditional Lunar New Year, especially in the coastal city of Limassol, with many activities included Vietnamese folk songs, dancing, and folk games.

In 2015, for the first time, the Vietnamese in Cyprus organized a program to welcome the new spring in Limassol, during which many art items traditional long dress and unique costumes of ethnic minorities in northwestern region and folk games of Vietnam were performed.

Language

As of 2011, there were 6,979 Vietnamese speakers in Cyprus.

References

External links
Người Việt Nam tại Đảo Síp đón chào năm mới. A YouTube video clip shows the Vietnamese celebrating new year.
Vietnamese celebrities join cultural week in Cyprus

 
Immigrants to Cyprus
Cyprus